Henry Medarious (born 20 September 1998) is a Ghanaian professional footballer who plays for Vitória Guimarães B, as a forward.

Football career
On 12 September 2015, Medarious made his professional debut with Sporting Covilhã in a 2015–16 Segunda Liga match against Farense.

References

External links

Stats and profile at LPFP 

1998 births
Footballers from Accra
Living people
Ghanaian footballers
Association football forwards
S.C. Covilhã players
Vitória S.C. B players
Leixões S.C. players
Liga Portugal 2 players
Ghanaian expatriate footballers
Expatriate footballers in Portugal